La Clef is a cinema in Paris, France.

History 
The cinema was founded in 1973 by Claude Frank-Forter, with the goal of promoting underrepresented filmmakers and of offering affordable prices. In 1981, after the cinema industry across France hit a recession, Frank-Forter sold the cinema to the Groupe Caisse d'Épargne. In 1990, filmmaker Sanvi Panou founded the Images d'Ailleurs project in the cinema, with the goal of presenting African and South America content.

In 2015, the Groupe Caisse d'Épargne announced that it would be selling the building in which the cinema was located. In 2018, the Groupe announced that the cinema would be closing down.

In 2019, a local radical group calling itself the Cinéma La Clef Revival Collective began an occupation of the building, intending to re-open the cinema and continue its operations under a democratic structure. On the first night of the occupation, the collective screened the film Attica, about the Attica Prison riot. Later in 2019, the cinema was the site of an action taken by striking workers from the Paris Opera Ballet, who put on a performance of Swan Lake. The collective also launched a programme titled Studio 34 to support young filmmakers in creating short films.

On 1 March 2022, the Compagnies Républicaines de Sécurité raided the cinema and evicted the collective, ending the occupation after three years. Later that month, municipal councillor Danielle Simonnet proposed a motion for the Council of Paris to buy the cinema and allow the collective to continue operations, however the motion was rejected by the city executives.

References 

Cinemas in France